Penicillium dipodomyis is a species of the genus of Penicillium which occurs in kangaroo rats and produces penicillin and the diketopiperazine dipodazine.

See also
 List of Penicillium species

References

Further reading

  
 

dipodomyis
Fungi described in 1997